Epermenia kenyacola is a moth in the family Epermeniidae. It was described by Reinhard Gaedike in 2013. It is found in the Democratic Republic of the Congo (Katanga), Kenya and Malawi.

References

Epermeniidae
Moths described in 2013
Moths of Africa
Lepidoptera of the Democratic Republic of the Congo
Lepidoptera of Kenya
Lepidoptera of Malawi